Aberia is an extinct genus of brachiopod found in Ordovician strata in Finistère, France. It was a stationary epifaunal suspension feeder.

References 

Ordovician brachiopods